The 1920 Summer Olympics ice hockey rosters consisted of 60 players on 7 national ice hockey teams. Played at the Olympic Games for the first time, and later regarded by the International Ice Hockey Federation (IIHF) as the first World Championship. Teams were required to be strictly amateur, so players from the Canadian-based National Hockey League (NHL) or other professional leagues were excluded. Canada sent the Winnipeg Falcons, who had won the 1920 Allan Cup, the amateur championship in Canada.

The matches were  played 7 per side with 3 forwards, 2 defencemen, a rover, and a goaltender with no substitutions during the match. Due to the tournaments format that saw some teams only play a single match several teams brought players that would never see the ice.

Legend

Teams

Belgium

Coach:  Paul Loicq

Canada

Canada elected to send the Winnipeg Falcons who won the 1920 Allan Cup, a championship to declare the top amateur hockey team in the country.

Coach:  Guðmundur Sigurjónsson

Czechoslovakia
Coach:  Adolf Dušek

France

Coach:  Ernie Garon

Sweden

Nils Molander, David Säfwenberg and Hans-Jacob Mattsson had ice hockey experience outside Sweden but the rest were drawn from local bandy clubs.

Coach:  Raoul Le Mat

Switzerland

Coach:  Max Sillig

United States

Originally the United States planned to send the winner of an elimination playoff but ultimately scrapped the idea.

Coach:  Cornelius Fellowes

References

External links
 International Olympic Committee results database

Bibliography

 
 
 

rosters
1920